Adam Ramanauskas (born 19 November 1980) is a former Australian rules footballer for the Essendon Football Club.

Of Lithuanian descent, Ramanauskas was selected at no. 12 in the 1998 AFL Draft and was mainly a defender or midfielder. In 2000, he was a regular selection on the wing in Essendon's 2000 premiership season, in which they lost just one game for the entire year.

Biography

Ramanauskas debuted with the Essendon Football Club in 1999 after being selected at No. 12 in the 1998 AFL Draft. Playing mainly as a defender or midfielder, he was an integral member of the dominant 2000 Bombers' premiership team.

Regarded as one of AFL's up-and-coming young stars, Ramanauskas was runner-up in the AFL Rising Star Award in 2000 and placed third in Essendon's Crichton Medal the following year before being diagnosed with cancer in 2003.

After surgery, Ramanauskas missed eight matches but made a quick recovery to play a handful of games again in 2003 before a recurrence of his cancer. He had weeks of radiotherapy treatment, but he managed to come back and compete a solid 2004 season, where he played in all of the Bombers' 24 games.

Ramanauskas had more misfortune in 2005 when he underwent a season-ending knee reconstruction after a Round 4 training mishap. After he had completed his recovery, he was set to make another comeback. However, in February 2006, a recurrence of the cancer appeared, and he underwent further invasive surgery and six months of chemotherapy treatment.

At the end of 2006, Essendon sought special consideration from the AFL to place Ramanauskas on a mature-aged rookie list for the 2007 season. In July 2007, Ramanauskas was elevated to the senior list and played his first AFL match in two years.

Named as one of The Australian newspaper's "Most Inspirational People" in 2007, Ramanauskas's courage and determination both on and off the field has inspired many. Since 2007, he has worked passionately with the Essendon Football Club Community Affairs Department, co-ordinating youth programs and developing a strong alliance with the Cancer Council of Victoria.

Ramanauskas announced his retirement from AFL football at the end of the 2008 season. In 2009, he accepted a part-time role at Essendon focusing on fast-tracking the development of the club's youngest players. Alongside his duties at Essendon, he also began work on the management team at Elite Sports Properties, a sports talent management agency. He has also joined the football commentary team at 774 ABC Radio.

Career highlights

 Essendon Football Club, VFL Reserves Premiership, 1999
 Essendon Football Club, VFL Reserves Best & Fairest Player, 1999
 Essendon Football Club, AFL Pre-Season Premiership, 2000
 Essendon Football Club, AFL Premiership, 2000
 AFL Rising Star Award, Runner-Up, 2000
 Represented Australia, International Rules Series against Ireland, 2001
 Essendon Football Club, Crichton Medal (Best & Fairest Award), 3rd Runner-Up, 2001
 Essendon Football Club, "Best Clubman", 2005
 Essendon Football Club, "Most Courageous Player", 2007
 AFLPA, "Community Spirit Award Winner", 2008

Best games
 32 disposals (26 kicks, 6 handballs), 8 marks and a goal in Round 10, 2002: 8-point loss to the North Melbourne Football Club
 31 disposals (17 kicks 14 handballs) and 14 marks in Round 11, 2000: 58-point win over Geelong Football Club

Football, cancer and injury
In 2003, Ramanauskas was diagnosed with a low grade cancer (fibromatosis) in his neck after Round 3. He missed the next eight matches but made a quick recovery to play again in 2003. Following this was a solid 2004 season in which he played in all of the Bombers' 24 games.

Ramanauskas had more misfortune in 2005 when he underwent a knee reconstruction after a Round 4 training mishap. After he had completed his recovery, however, in February 2006, a recurrence of the cancer appeared.

At the end of 2006, Ramanauskas was delisted by Essendon, who asked for special consideration in placing him on a mature-aged rookie list for the 2007 season. After long deliberation by the AFL Commission on this issue, Essendon were granted permission for this to go ahead. Ramanauskas was re-drafted by Essendon with pick 33 in the 2006 Rookie Draft. On Wednesday, 4 July, Ramanauskas was elevated to the senior list and played his first AFL match in two years against the Geelong Football Club on 6 July 2007.

Statistics

|- style="background-color: #EAEAEA"
! scope="row" style="text-align:center" | 1999
|style="text-align:center;"|
| 9 || 2 || 0 || 0 || 9 || 4 || 13 || 1 || 5 || 0.0 || 0.0 || 4.5 || 2.0 || 6.5 || 0.5 || 2.5 || 0
|-
! scope="row" style="text-align:center" | 2000
|style="text-align:center;"|
| 9 || 24 || 13 || 8 || 221 || 155 || 376 || 105 || 38 || 0.5 || 0.3 || 9.2 || 6.5 || 15.7 || 4.4 || 1.6 || 4
|- style="background:#eaeaea;"
! scope="row" style="text-align:center" | 2001
|style="text-align:center;"|
| 9 || 25 || 13 || 3 || 258 || 124 || 382 || 90 || 50 || 0.5 || 0.1 || 10.3 || 5.0 || 15.3 || 3.6 || 2.0 || 3
|-
! scope="row" style="text-align:center" | 2002
|style="text-align:center;"|
| 9 || 23 || 13 || 5 || 275 || 124 || 399 || 109 || 49 || 0.6 || 0.2 || 12.0 || 5.4 || 17.3 || 4.7 || 2.1 || 7
|- style="background:#eaeaea;"
! scope="row" style="text-align:center" | 2003
|style="text-align:center;"|
| 9 || 10 || 8 || 10 || 107 || 63 || 170 || 34 || 23 || 0.8 || 1.0 || 10.7 || 6.3 || 17.0 || 3.4 || 2.3 || 0
|-
! scope="row" style="text-align:center" | 2004
|style="text-align:center;"|
| 9 || 24 || 6 || 6 || 220 || 104 || 324 || 112 || 31 || 0.3 || 0.3 || 9.2 || 4.3 || 13.5 || 4.7 || 1.3 || 0
|- style="background:#eaeaea;"
! scope="row" style="text-align:center" | 2005
|style="text-align:center;"|
| 9 || 3 || 0 || 0 || 22 || 16 || 38 || 9 || 8 || 0.0 || 0.0 || 7.3 || 5.3 || 12.7 || 3.0 || 2.7 || 0
|-
! scope="row" style="text-align:center" | 2006
|style="text-align:center;"|
| 9 || 0 || – || – || – || – || – || – || – || – || – || – || – || – || – || – || 0
|- style="background:#eaeaea;"
! scope="row" style="text-align:center" | 2007
|style="text-align:center;"|
| 9 || 5 || 3 || 2 || 36 || 24 || 60 || 19 || 6 || 0.6 || 0.4 || 7.2 || 4.8 || 12.0 || 3.8 || 1.2 || 0
|-
! scope="row" style="text-align:center" | 2008
|style="text-align:center;"|
| 9 || 18 || 7 || 2 || 140 || 102 || 242 || 77 || 28 || 0.4 || 0.1 || 7.8 || 5.7 || 13.4 || 4.3 || 1.6 || 0
|- class="sortbottom"
! colspan=3| Career
! 134
! 63
! 36
! 1288
! 716
! 2004
! 556
! 238
! 0.5
! 0.3
! 9.6
! 5.3
! 15.0
! 4.1
! 1.8
! 14
|}

Retirement

On 25 August 2008, Ramanauskas and longtime teammate Jason Johnson announced their retirements from AFL effective at the end of the season.

Media career
Ramanauskas is now an expert AFL commentator for 774 ABC as well as a Foxtel Cup commentator for Fox Footy.

Personal life
Ramanauskas was born to Joseph and Lucy Ramanauskas and grew up in Doveton, Victoria. He has an older brother, Daniel, and younger sister, Kayla. Ramanauskas attended Doveton Primary School. He later graduated high school from St John's Regional College, Dandenong, in 1998. Growing up, he supported the Richmond Football Club.

Ramanauskas married his high-school sweetheart, Belinda Henneman, in January 2006. They have two sons, Aidan (born October 2008) and Lucas (born August 2010).

References

External links
 

1980 births
Living people
Australian people of Lithuanian descent
Australian rules footballers from Melbourne
Dandenong Stingrays players
Essendon Football Club players
Essendon Football Club Premiership players
Australia international rules football team players
One-time VFL/AFL Premiership players
People from the City of Casey
Australian rules football commentators